R621 road may refer to:
 R621 road (Ireland)
 R621 (South Africa)